Toni Hellinen (born 21 September 1982 in Alavus) is Finnish meteorologist and reporter. He came to prominence as a sports reporter during the 2020 Tokyo Olympics.

References

Living people
1982 births
Finnish meteorologists
Finnish journalists